In mathematics, a Lie algebra  is nilpotent if its lower central series terminates in the zero subalgebra. The lower central series is the sequence of subalgebras

If the lower central series eventually arrives at the zero subalgebra, then the Lie algebra is called nilpotent. The lower central series for Lie algebras is analogous to the lower central series in group theory, and nilpotent Lie algebras are analogs of nilpotent groups.

The nilpotent Lie algebras are precisely those that can be obtained from abelian Lie algebras, by successive central extensions.

Note that the definition means that, viewed as a non-associative non-unital algebra, a Lie algebra  is nilpotent if it is nilpotent as an ideal.

Definition 
Let  be a Lie algebra. One says that  is nilpotent if the lower central series terminates, i.e. if   for some 

Explicitly, this means that
 

so that .

Equivalent conditions

A very special consequence of (1) is that

Thus  for all .  That is,  is a nilpotent endomorphism in the usual sense of linear endomorphisms (rather than of Lie algebras). We call such an element  in  ad-nilpotent.

Remarkably, if  is finite dimensional, the apparently much weaker condition (2) is actually equivalent to (1), as stated by

which we will not prove here.

A somewhat easier equivalent condition for the nilpotency of  :   is nilpotent if and only if  is nilpotent (as a Lie algebra). To see this, first observe that (1) implies that  is nilpotent, since the expansion of an -fold nested bracket will consist of terms of the form in (1). Conversely, one may write

and since  is a Lie algebra homomorphism,

If  is nilpotent, the last expression is zero for large enough n, and accordingly the first. But this implies (1), so  is nilpotent.

Also, a finite-dimensional Lie algebra is nilpotent if and only if there exists a descending chain of ideals  such that .

Examples

Strictly upper triangular matrices 

Heisenberg algebras 
A Heisenberg algebra is nilpotent. For example, in dimension 3, the commutator of two matriceswhere .

Cartan subalgebras 
A Cartan subalgebra  of a Lie algebra  is nilpotent and self-normalizing page 80. The self-normalizing condition is equivalent to being the normalizer of a Lie algebra. This means .

Other examples 

Properties

Nilpotent Lie algebras are solvable 
Every nilpotent Lie algebra is solvable. This is useful in proving the solvability of a Lie algebra since, in practice, it is usually easier to prove nilpotency (when it holds!) rather than solvability. However, in general, the converse of this property is false. For example, the subalgebra of  consisting of upper triangular matrices, is solvable but not nilpotent.

Subalgebras and images 
If a Lie algebra  is nilpotent, then all subalgebras and homomorphic images are nilpotent.

Nilpotency of the quotient by the center 
This is to say that a central extension of a nilpotent Lie algebra by a nilpotent Lie algebra is nilpotent.

Engel's theorem 

Zero Killing form 

Have outer automorphisms 
A nilpotent Lie algebra has an outer automorphism, that is, an automorphism that is not in the image of Ad.

Derived subalgebras of solvable Lie algebras 
The derived subalgebra of a finite dimensional solvable Lie algebra over a field of characteristic 0 is nilpotent.

See also
Solvable Lie algebra

Notes

References

.

Properties of Lie algebras